Sacred Heart is the third studio album by American 
heavy metal band Dio. It was released on August 12, 1985 on Warner Bros. Records in North America, and Vertigo elsewhere. The record peaked at No. 29 on the Billboard 200 chart. It includes the singles "Rock 'n' Roll Children" and "Hungry for Heaven".

This was the last Dio album to include guitarist Vivian Campbell, who was fired midway through the album's tour. Campbell went on to join several other bands, most notably Def Leppard, Riverdogs, Whitesnake and Thin Lizzy. A rift occurred during the recording of this album between Dio and the guitarist, Dio stating in an interview "...for me, he (Viv) wasn't even there for this record." The album, along with Holy Diver and The Last in Line, was released in a new 2-CD Deluxe Edition on March 19, 2012 through Universal for worldwide distribution outside the U.S. Clocking in at 38 minutes, Sacred Heart is the band's shortest album.

The RIAA certified Sacred Heart Gold (500,000 units sold) on October 15, 1985. It was for a long time the last Dio album to receive this certification, until The Very Beast of Dio was certified gold on November 3, 2009.

Tour
The accompanying stageshow was a spectacle involving a mechanised dragon and laser effects, as captured on the VHS (and later DVD reissue) Sacred Heart "The Video". Ronnie James Dio and his band referred to the dragon as Dean (although the press renamed it “Denzil”).

Cover 
The cover art is by Robert Florczak. The inscription around the border of the cover is in Latin and reads FINIS PER SOMNIVM REPERIO TIBI SACRA COR VENEFICVS OSTIVM AVRVM. A possible rendering is Along the borders of dreams I found for you the sacred poisonous heart and golden door. More data useful for the interpretation could be contained within the lyrics to the song "Sacred Heart". Since Latin relies on context for a translation the inscription could translate as follows, "comes the end by sleep I will prepare the sacred heart which is the magic that opens upon the altar".

Track listing

Personnel
Dio
Ronnie James Dio – vocals
Vinny Appice – drums
Jimmy Bain – bass
Vivian Campbell – guitar
Claude Schnell – keyboards

Additional musician
Craig Goldy – guitar on "Time to Burn"

Production
 Recorded at Rumbo Recorders, Los Angeles, California
 Produced by Ronnie James Dio
 Engineered by Angelo Arcuri
 Assistant engineered by Gary McGachan
 Laser effects: LaserMedia Inc., Los Angeles, California
 Laser operator: Michael Moorhead
 Originally mastered by Greg Fulginiti at Artisan Sound Recorders, Hollywood, California
 Remastered by Andy Pearce (2012 Universal Deluxe Edition)
 Mixed on Westlake Audio BBSM6 monitors
 Illustration by Robert Florczak

Charts

Album

Singles

Rock 'n' Roll Children

Hungry for Heaven

Certifications

References

External links 
 "Rock 'n' Roll Children" video clip
 "Hungry for Heaven" video clip
 Sacred Heart song lyrics

1985 albums
Dio (band) albums
Warner Records albums
Vertigo Records albums

es:Sagrado Corazón (desambiguación)#Sacred Heart